Oat blue dwarf virus (OBDV) is a plant pathogenic virus of the family Tymoviridae. It replicates within leafhopper vectors, and when these vectors feed, the virus is transmitted to the plant. It can infect oats and barley.

References

External links
 ICTVdB - The Universal Virus Database: Oat blue dwarf virus
 Family Groups - The Baltimore Method

Tymoviridae
Viral plant pathogens and diseases